Luca Brasi is a fictional character in the 1969 novel The Godfather by Mario Puzo.

Luca Brasi may also refer to:
 Luca Brasi 2, a 2014 mixtape by Kevin Gates
 Luca Brasi 3, a 2018 mixtape by Kevin Gates
 Luca Brasi (band), an Australian punk rock band

See also
 Luca Braidot, an Italian mountain bike racer